KPVU (91.3 FM) is a college radio station located on the campus of Prairie View A&M University in Prairie View, Texas, 25 miles northwest of Houston's city limits.  Owned and operated by Prairie View A&M, KPVU's studios are located on campus at the Hilliard Hall Communications Center, and its transmitter is located near Panther Stadium, also on campus.

The station's playlist mainly consists of jazz, but at other times it plays Urban AC-level R&B and Gospel as well.

The signal is a rimshot over the northwestern portions of the Greater Houston area, fringing out over parts of the city.

External links
KPVU official website

PVU
PVU
NPR member stations
Radio stations established in 1981
Prairie View A&M University